The Asus Media Bus is a proprietary computer bus developed by Asus, which was used on some Socket 7 motherboards in the middle 1990s. It is a combined PCI and ISA slot. It was developed to provide a cost-efficient solution to a complete multimedia system. Using Media Bus cards for building a system reduced slot requirements and compatibility problems. Expansion cards supporting this interface were only manufactured by Asus for a very limited time. This bus is now obsolete.

While similar to PCI-X in appearance, the extension contains 4 additional pins (2 on each side) for a total of 68.  The divider between the PCI slot and Media Bus extension is too wide to support a properly-keyed PCI-X card.

Despite the very short lifespan, there were at least two revisions of Asus Media Bus – revision 1.2 and 2.0. The difference between them is that the latter revision has 72 pins instead of 68 so it does not have to use any PCI slot signals reserved for PCI cards and PCI slot shared with the Media Bus slot becomes standards compliant. The gap between PCI slot and Media Bus extension is 0.32 in. for revision 1.2 (pictured) and 0.4 in. for revision 2.0 so expansion cards designed for two revisions are mutually incompatible.

Expansion cards designed for this interface included primarily combined audio and video cards, but also some combined SCSI and audio cards. The (possibly incomplete) list of Media Bus expansion cards presented here (all cards manufactured by Asus):

Media Bus rev. 1.2 cards
 PCI-AS7870 – Fast/Wide SCSI and audio card (Adaptec AS7870 and Vibra16s (with separate Yamaha yfm262-m))
 PCI-AV264CT – audio and video card (ATI Mach64 PCI 1 MiB (up to 2 MiB) and Vibra16s (with separate Yamaha yfm262-m))
 PCI-AV868 (pictured) – audio and video card (S3 Vision868 1 MiB and Vibra16s (with separate Yamaha yfm262-m))

Media Bus rev. 1.2 motherboards
 Asus P/I-P55SP4
 Asus P/I-P55TP4XE

Media Bus rev. 2.0 cards
 PCI-AS2940UW – Ultra Fast/Wide SCSI and audio card
 PCI-AV264CT-N – audio and video card (ATI Mach64 PCI 1 MiB (up to 2 MiB) and Vibra16c) 
 PCI-AV264VT – audio and video card (ATI Mach64 PCI 1 MiB (up to 2 MiB) and Vibra16c)
 PCI-AV264GT – audio and video card (ATI Rage PCI 2 MiB and Vibra16c) 
 PCI-AV264GT/Plus – audio and video card (ATI 3D Rage II 2 MiB (up to 4 MiB) and Vibra16c)

Media Bus rev. 2.0 motherboards Socket 7
 Asus P/E-P55T2P4D (Dual)
 Asus P/I-P55T2P4
 Asus P/I-P55TVP4
 Asus P/I-XP55T2P4
 Asus P/I-XP55T2P4S
 Asus P55TP4N
 Asus TXP4-X (optional?)
 Asus TX97
 Asus TX97-E
Media Bus rev. 2.0 motherboards Socket 8
 Asus P/I-P6NP5
 Asus P/I-P6RP4
 Asus P/I-XP6NP5
 Asus P65UP5 + P6ND CPU Card (Dual)

References 

Media Bus
Computer buses